Imèr is a comune (municipality) in Trentino, located about  east of Trento in northern Italy.

The municipality of Imer contains the frazioni (subdivisions, mainly villages and hamlets) Masi di Imèr, village Sass Maor and Pontet.

Imer borders the following municipalities: Primiero San Martino di Castrozza, Canal San Bovo, Mezzano and Sovramonte.

It includes the Vederne mountain and a part of the Noana valley.

Demographic evolution

References

External links
 Homepage of the city

Cities and towns in Trentino-Alto Adige/Südtirol